Karen Muradyan (born 1 November 1992 in Gyumri) is an Armenian football player who plays as a midfielder for the Armenian Premier League club FC Ararat-Armenia.

Career

Club
Karen Muradyan was born in Gyumri. At one year of age, he and his parents moved to Russia. Karen started watching football on TV. He liked the sport more and more and wanted to become a football player when he was 7 years old. Two years later, he went to the first football school of CYSS Mytischi. In youth football, he changed three teams, the last of which was the team SDYUSHOR Labor Reserves. With performances in the team in 2008, Muradyan joined a team in Moscow and took second place in the Russian National Football League.

Muradyan moved back to his home Gyumri and met with the breeders of the club Shirak Gyumri. After that, Muradyan invited to play and he was later awarded with a contract. Muradyan debuted on July 24, 2011, in a game against the guest Mika Yerevan. Muradyan entered the field in the first team and played until the 60th minute, when he was replaced by Arman Margaryan. But the debut was overshadowed by the crushing defeat of Gyumri team 1:4. His Armenian Cup debut came on the draw for next season. On November 20, 2011, Shirak had a home game against Banants Yerevan, which they won with a minimal victory 2-1. Muradyan came off the bench in the 73rd minute of the match, replacing Grachev Mnatsakanyan. In the same drawing, Shirak reached the final, beating Dilijan Impulse 1-0. Muradyan played the entire match and won the 2011–12 Armenian Cup tournament medals.

In 2017, Muradyan moved to Gällivare Malmbergets in Sweden.

In December 2017, Muradyan left Alashkert. In September 2018, Muradyan joined Shirak. On 5 December 2019, Muradyan extended his contract with Shirak for another year.

On 26 July 2020, Muradyan joined FC Ararat Yerevan. One month later, Muradyan returned to Shirak on loan to help the club out with their UEFA Europa League qualifying match on 27 August 2021.

On 1 August 2021, Ararat Yerevan announced that Muradyan had left the club after his contract had expired, with Muradyan going on to sign for Ararat-Armenia on 4 August 2021.

International
Muradyan made his debut for the Armenia national football team on February 5, 2013 in a friendly match in Valence, France against Luxembourg.

Career statistics

Club

International

Honours

Club
Shirak Gyumri
Armenian Cup (1): 2011–12
Armenian Cup Runner-up (1): 2011

References

External links
Profile at ffa.am

1989 births
Living people
Footballers from Gyumri
Armenian footballers
Association football midfielders
Armenia international footballers
FC Shirak players
Armenian Premier League players
Division 2 (Swedish football) players
Armenia under-21 international footballers
FC Alashkert players
Armenian expatriate footballers
Expatriate footballers in Sweden